Scoriadopsis is a genus of fungi within the Capnodiaceae family. This is a monotypic genus, containing the single species Scoriadopsis miconiae.

References 

Capnodiaceae
Monotypic Dothideomycetes genera